Cardiograptus is a genus of graptolite, which is easily recognised even when poorly preserved by the form of the thecae.

References

Graptolite genera
Glossograptidae
Paleozoic life of Newfoundland and Labrador
Paleozoic life of Yukon